Sir George de la Poer Beresford, 2nd Baronet (1 March 1811 – 11 February 1873) was an Irish Conservative politician, peer, and army officer. Son of Sir John Beresford, 1st Baronet and Mary née Molly. In 1846 he married Elizabeth Lucas, daughter of Davis Lucas. He had at least four children, including: Mary Beresford (died 1847); Marcia Mary Ann Harriet Wilhelmina de la Poer Beresford (died 1908); John Edward Francis de la Poer Beresford (1851–1854); and William Carr de la Poer Beresford (1858–188).

At the ensuing by-election, he stood again but was unsuccessful.

He succeeded to the Baronetcy of Bagnall in 1844 upon the death of his father. Upon his own death in 1873, the title was inherited by Henry Monson de la Poer Beresford-Peirse.

He was also a member of the Travellers Club and White's.

References

External links
 

UK MPs 1841–1847
Irish Conservative Party MPs
Baronets in the Baronetage of the United Kingdom
George
1811 births
1873 deaths